Epictia goudotii, or the black blind snake, is a species of snake in the family Leptotyphlopidae. The species is endemic to Middle America.

Etymology
The specific name, goudotii, is in honor of French naturalist Justin-Marie Goudot.

Geographic range
In Central America, E. goudotii is found in Belize, Costa Rica, El Salvador, Guatemala, Honduras, Mexico (Oaxaca), Nicaragua, and Panama.

In South America, it is found in western Colombia, Venezuela, and on associated islands.

References

Further reading
Boulenger GA  (1893). Catalogue of the Snakes in the British Museum (Natural History). Volume I., Containing the Families ... Glauconiidæ ... London: Trustees of the British Museum (Natural History). (Taylor and Francis, printers). xiii + 448 pp. + Plates I-XXVIII. (Glauconia goudotii, p. 64).
Duméril A-M-C, Bibron G (1844). Erpétologie génerale ou Histoire naturelle complète des Reptiles, Tome sixième [Volume 6]. Paris: Roret. xii + 609 pp. (Stenostoma goudotii, new species, p. 330). (in French).
Jan [G]  (1861). Iconographie générale des Ophidiens, Deuxième livraison [Issue 2]. (Illustrated by Ferdinando Sordelli). Paris: Baillière. Index + Plates I-VI. (Stenostoma goudotii, Plate V, figure 2; Plate VI, figure 2). (in French).

Epictia
Reptiles described in 1844
Taxa named by André Marie Constant Duméril
Taxa named by Gabriel Bibron